Davide Boscaro (born 13 July 2000) is an Italian road and track cyclist, who currently rides for UCI Continental team .

Major results

Track
2018
 National Junior Track Championships
1st  Omnium
1st  Kilometer
 2nd  Team pursuit, UEC European Junior Championships
2019
 2nd Sprint, National Track Championships
2020
 2nd  Team pursuit – Milton, 2019–20 UCI World Cup
 2nd  Team pursuit, UEC European Under-23 Championships
2021
 1st  Keirin, National Track Championships
 2nd  Team pursuit – St. Petersburg, UCI Nations Cup
 3rd  Team pursuit, UEC European Junior Championships

Road
2018
 1st Stage 2 Tre Giorni Ciclista Bresciana
2021
 3rd Vicenza–Bionde
 7th Circuito del Porto

References

External links

2000 births
Living people
Italian male cyclists
Italian track cyclists
Sportspeople from Padua
European Games competitors for Italy
Cyclists at the 2019 European Games
Cyclists from the Province of Padua